Wheatland High School is a secondary education school in Platte County School District #1 in Wheatland, Wyoming.

Their mascot is the bulldog. The school colors are blue, gold, and white. They have a wrestling, basketball, football, volleyball, softball, track, golf, cross country, marching band and cheer teams. They also have a drama program, academic decathlon and much more.

References
Official website

Educational institutions in the United States with year of establishment missing
Public high schools in Wyoming
Schools in Platte County, Wyoming